North Bolaang Mongondow Regency is a regency of North Sulawesi Province of Indonesia.  Boroko is the principal town of the regency. The regency covers an area of 1,856.86 km2 and had a population of 70,693 at the 2010 Census and 83,112 at the 2020 Census.

Administration 
The Regency is divided into six districts (kecamatan), which are tabulated below with their areas and their populations at the 2010 Census and 2020 Census. The table also includes he location of the district administrative centres, the number of administrative villages (rural desa and urban kelurahan) in each district, and it's postal codes.

Notes: (a) Bolang Itang Timur District includes the offshore island of Nunuka. (b) Kaidipang  District includes two offshore islands - Damar and Tikus. (c) Pinogaluman District includes three offshore islands - Anuling, Bongkil and Keramat.

References

Regencies of North Sulawesi